Christ and the Woman Taken in Adultery is an incident from the New Testament.

Christ and the Woman Taken in Adultery or Woman Taken in Adultery may also refer to:

Christ and the Woman Taken in Adultery, a fresco by Agostino, one of the Palazzo Sampieri frescoes
Christ and the Woman Taken in Adultery (Beckmann), a 1917 painting by Beckmann
Christ and the Woman Taken in Adultery (Bruegel), a 1565 painting by Pieter Bruegel the Elder
Christ and the Woman Taken in Adultery (Preti), a 1650 painting by Mattia Preti
The Woman Taken in Adultery (Rembrandt), a 1644 painting by Rembrandt
Christ and the Woman Taken in Adultery (Rubens), an 1899 painting by Rubens
Woman Taken in Adultery, a 1590s painting by Paolo Veronese, part of the Duke of Buckingham series
The Woman Taken in Adultery, a 1987 play by Wilfred Watson

See also 

 Christ and the Adulteress (Titian, Glasgow)
 Christ and the Adulteress (Titian, Vienna)